Kentucky Route 588 (KY 588) is a  state highway in Letcher County, Kentucky, that runs from KY 7 in Blackey to KY 931 at Ice via Blackey and Roxana.

Major intersections

References

0588
Transportation in Letcher County, Kentucky